Hubert Kah is the sixth studio album by Hubert Kah, released by Polydor in 1996.

Background
Hubert Kah was Hubert Kemmler's first album of new material since the release of Hubert Kah's album Sound of My Heart in 1989. At the time of the release of Sound of My Heart, Kemmler felt indifferent to the musical direction he had adopted, including his collaborative work with producer Michael Cretu. He decided to withdraw from the music industry by disbanding Hubert Kah and ending his collaboration with Cretu. During the same period, Kemmler also suffered from a mental breakdown and depression. He subsequently travelled, read Hermann Hesse, studied King Ludwig II of Bavaria and listened to the works of Richard Wagner.

Having discovered a love for the music and artistic personalities of the 19th century, Kemmler returned to writing and recording music, in which he tried to find a musical style that "has nothing to do with the zeitgeist [but] is still modern". The majority of the music on Hubert Kah, which was written by Kemmler and fellow German composer Dietmar Kawohl, attempted to merge pop and classical music. Many of the lyrics were written by Kemmler's then-wife, . When work on his new music exceeded the budget provided by Polydor, Kemmler spent over 1 million Deutsche Mark of his own money on the recording of Hubert Kah.

Speaking of the album, Kemmler told Focus in 1995: "With my new record I have to tell about the way out of the darkness and narrowness and about hope. I can show that there is still emotion, romance and warmth." Many of the album's songs relate to Kemmler's personal struggles, including "Sailing (Away from Me)", "I Came to You (Oriental Moon)" and "Fortress Around My Heart". "Prélude Pour Mme S." was inspired by Kemmler's "deep love for [his] wife". The lyrical message of "C'est La Vie" relates to "trust[ing] your heart". "Prélude Pour Mme S." is adapted from Frédéric Chopin's "Prelude, Op. 28, No. 4". The instrumental "Only Dreaming" includes the tune of "Song to the Evening Star" by Wagner, played by a music box.

Recording
Hubert Kah was recorded and mixed at Pilot Studios in Munich. The vocals were recorded at Village Recording Studio, Pilot Studios and Weryton Studios in Munich, and Atlantis Tonstudio in Reutlingen. The orchestral parts provided by the Vienna Symphony were recorded at Jugendstilsaal, Elisabethhöhe, Vienna. "Fortress Around My Heart" features strings recorded by the Munich Philharmonic at Bavaria Tonstudio in Munich. Kemmler had initially recorded more with the Munich Philharmonic but abandoned those recordings in favour of those by the Vienna Symphony.

A number of sounds were recorded on Kemmler's travels for use on the album. The grotto and waterfall sounds on "Schlaf Ein" were recorded at Linderhof Palace. "I Came to You (Oriental Moon)" contains prayer chants recorded by Kemmler during his time in Oman and the United Arab Emirates.

Singles
"C'est La Vie" was released as the album's lead single in 1995 and again in 1996. The song's music video was directed by Anno Saul. "C'est La Vie" was later released as a promotional single by Curb in the United States in 1997. It had received 248 spins as of 7 November 1997 and was subsequently listed on the Gavin Reports "A/C Up and Coming" list. "Sailing" was released as the album's second and final single in 1997.

Critical reception
Upon its release, Der Spiegel described the album as "deserving of all respect", with Kemmler singing of "fear, anger [and] isolation". They considered the album to "succeed in the 'connection between romantic classic and pop' that Kemmler has set himself the goal of".

Track listing

Personnel
 Hubert Kemmler – vocals, keyboards
 Kristian Schultze – keyboards, arranger, piano (track 7), orchestral transcription (track 4)
  – keyboards, piano, musical director
 Hermann Weindorf – orchestral transcription (tracks 1–3, 5–11)
 , Ozzy Schaller – guitars
 Walter Keiser – drum programming, live drums
 Eric Bond – drum programming
 Curt Cress – live drums
 Vienna Symphony – orchestral parts except on "Fortress Around My Heart"
 Claudius Traunfellner – conductor
 Marcus Trefny – solo cello
  – female vocals (tracks 3, 6)
 Bavarian State Orchestra – male choir (track 4)
 Munich Philharmonic – strings (track 7)
 Sreten Krstič – violin (track 7)
  and Friends – guitar and brass section (track 7)
 Chris Thompson and Friends, London – gospel choir (track 8)
 Alex Catarinelli – sampling, sound libraryProduction  – producer, arranger, drum programming, mixingOther'
 Michael Moesslang – graphic design
 Manuel Schoebl – illustrations, paintings
 Susanne Kemmler – photography

References

1996 albums
Polydor Records albums
Hubert Kah albums